(call sign JOFV-FM) is a commercial radio station based at Daiwa  Building in Tenjimbashi Nichome, Kita-ku, Osaka, Japan, broadcasting on 80.2 FM from Mount Iimori to Kansai region. As a latecomer to the radio broadcasting market, it was a focal point for FM802 to differentiate from existing stations. Therefore, rather than featuring music promoted by the productions, they chose to air tunes of their choice in heavy rotation. The station is considered the most popular among younger generation in Osaka.

FM802 was founded in September 1988, going on air in June the following year, with the call sign of JOFV-FM. The station is a member of the Japan FM League (JFL). It operates 24 hours a day, seven days a week.

Navigators

Present
 Sachiko Aoyama
 Hiroaki Asai
 Don Beaver (also a DJ for sister station FM Cocolo)
 Komaki Doi
 Dean Fujioka
 Yuichiro Furutachi
 Robert Harris
 Kazuyo Hayakawa
 Satoshi Hirano
 Daigo Iimuro
 Masa Itoh
 Makiko Kato
 Miki Kato
 Ryuichi Kawamura
 Yume Kitou
 Koji Kubota
 Yuki Mihara
 Nao Minamisawa
 Hiroto Nakajima
 Shin Nishida
 Masao Nomura
 Kentaro Ochiai
 Takuto Onuki
 Takuya Takeuchi
 Masayuki "Mark E" Taniguchi (also a DJ for sister station FM Cocolo)
 Hiro Teradaira
 Shirley Tomioka-Sheridan
 Junko Uchida
 Yoshihito "Jiro" Wayama
 Mari Yamazoe
 Kunihiko Yasui (blocktime)
 Masahiro Yoshimura

Former
 Fumiya Fujii

Time signals
 The commercial message from a sponsor is played.
 The announcer says, "At the tone, the time is _ AM/PM from (sponsor)." It is followed by a short beep.

Notes

External links 
 FM802 Official website
 

Radio stations in Japan
Radio in Japan
Companies based in Osaka Prefecture